The Val Barker Trophy is presented every four years to the most "outstanding boxer" at the Olympic Games.  In theory, the award goes to the top "pound for pound" boxer in the Olympics.  The winner is selected by a committee of International Boxing Association (amateur) (AIBA) officials.  The trophy is named after British boxer Val Barker who won the Amateur Boxing Association of England (ABA) heavyweight title in 1891, before becoming the secretary of the AIBA between 1926 and 1929.

The inaugural recipient of the Val Barker Trophy was American flyweight Louis Laurie who won bronze at the 1936 Summer Olympics in Berlin.  He is one of just three boxers who did not win gold at the same Olympics in which they were presented with the trophy, the others being Kenyan featherweight Philip Waruinge (bronze at the 1968 Games) and American light middleweight Roy Jones Jr. (silver at the 1988 Games).  In the 2016 Games, two Val Barker Trophies were presented for the first time, one for men and one for women;  women's boxing made its Olympic debut at the previous Games in 2012. The inaugural female winner was middleweight Claressa Shields who became the first American boxer to win two consecutive Olympic gold medals when she defeated Dutch boxer Nouchka Fontijn in Rio de Janeiro. 

American boxers lead with six trophies, followed by Kazakhstani boxers with three awards and Russian boxers with two awards (one for the Soviet Union and one for Russia).

Recipients

References

External links
Winners of the Val Barker Trophy at SportsReference.com

Boxing at the Summer Olympics
Awards established in 1936
Boxing awards